Firozabad is a Lok Sabha parliamentary constituency in Uttar Pradesh.

Assembly Segments

Members of Parliament

^ by poll

Election results

General elections 2019

General elections 2014

Bye Election 2009

2009 Election

See also
 Firozabad
 Firozabad (Mayoral Constituency)
 List of Constituencies of the Lok Sabha

Notes

References

Lok Sabha constituencies in Uttar Pradesh
Firozabad district